Paradiskollen  is a mountain of Viken in southern Norway.

Mountains of Viken